Fluvitrygon is a genus of stingrays in the family Dasyatidae from freshwater in southeast Asia. Its species were formerly contained within the genus Himantura.

Species
Fluvitrygon kittipongi (Vidthayanon & Roberts, 2006) (Roughback whipray)
Fluvitrygon oxyrhyncha (Sauvage, 1878) (Marbled whipray)
Fluvitrygon signifer (Compagno & Roberts, 1982) (White-edge freshwater whipray)

References

Dasyatidae
 
Taxa named by Peter R. Last
Taxa named by Bernadette Mabel Manjaji-Matsumoto
Freshwater fish genera